E3 ubiquitin-protein ligase RNF216 is an enzyme that in humans is encoded by the RNF216 gene.

This gene encodes a cytoplasmic protein which specifically colocalizes and interacts with the serine/threonine protein kinase, receptor-interacting protein (RIP). Zinc finger domains of the encoded protein are required for its interaction with RIP and for inhibition of TNF- and IL1-induced NF-kappa B activation pathways. The encoded protein may also function as an E3 ubiquitin-protein ligase which accepts ubiquitin from E2 ubiquitin-conjugating enzymes and transfers it to substrates. Several alternatively spliced transcript variants have been described for this locus but the full-length natures of only some are known.

See also
 RING finger domain

Interactions
RNF216 has been shown to interact with TLR9 and RIPK1.

References

Further reading

External links 
 

RING finger proteins